Lindsey Kimberley Thomas (born 27 April 1995) is a French professional footballer who plays as a forward for Serie A club AC Milan and the France national team.

Club career
Thomas grew up with her grand-mother in Guadeloupe, where she began her youth career with the Association de la Jeunesse Sportive (AJS) Santoise Football Club. She would play in inter-gender training matches there as the only female member of the club among 14 other male teammates, until she moved to France to join EJS Blanquefortaise in 2010.

After finishing her youth career by graduating from the Montpellier academy, Thomas played senior football with Montpellier for five years, which was briefly interrupted by a season-long loan to Swiss team Basel in the 2015–16 season. By the time she moved on loan to Bordeaux in November 2017, she was beginning to play as a striker. In July 2018, she joined Dijon on a season long loan deal.

In the summer of 2019, Thomas moved to Italy and signed with Roma. In her first season with the club, she played most games among all outfield players in the league while providing most number of assists and finishing as club's topscorer. During her second season, she helped the team to win 2020–21 Coppa Italia title, the first ever major trophy won by the team in their history.

Despite her major success with Roma, Thomas announced her departure from the club on 9 July 2021 and cited her desire for "a new adventure" as her reason for leaving the club. On 14 July 2021, it was officially confirmed that Thomas joined AC Milan on a two-year deal until June 2023.

International career
Thomas is a former French youth international. On 8 October 2022, she made her senior team debut for France in a 2–1 defeat against Germany.

Style of play
Thomas is a versatile forward with the awareness and tactical intelligence to string together the build-up play around the opponent's penalty area and help her teammates into easier chances on goal. In addition to her abilities in the build-up phase, she can use her strength and ability to shield the ball for effective hold-up play. She can also use her pace and finishing to create and score on fast-break counter attacks for her team. Her versatility has led to Thomas being played in all possible forward positions at club level

Career statistics

International

Honours
Roma
 Coppa Italia: 2020–21

France U19
 UEFA Women's Under-19 Championship: 2013

France U20
 FIFA U-20 Women's World Cup third place: 2014

References 

1995 births
Living people
French women's footballers
Guadeloupean footballers
Women's association football forwards
Serie A (women's football) players
A.S. Roma (women) players
A.C. Milan Women players
People from Saint-Claude, Guadeloupe
FC Girondins de Bordeaux (women) players
Montpellier HSC (women) players
Expatriate women's footballers in Italy
French expatriate sportspeople in Italy
French expatriate sportspeople in Switzerland
FC Basel Frauen players
Swiss Women's Super League players
Dijon FCO (women) players
French expatriate women's footballers
France women's international footballers